In enzymology, a glycine N-benzoyltransferase is an enzyme that catalyzes the chemical reaction

benzoyl-CoA + glycine  CoA + N-benzoylglycine

Thus, the two substrates of this enzyme are benzoyl-CoA and glycine, whereas its two products are CoA and N-benzoylglycine.

This enzyme belongs to the family of transferases, specifically those acyltransferases transferring groups other than aminoacyl groups.  The systematic name of this enzyme class is benzoyl-CoA:glycine N-benzoyltransferase. Other names in common use include benzoyl CoA-amino acid N-acyltransferase, and benzoyl-CoA:glycine N-acyltransferase.  This enzyme participates in phenylalanine metabolism.

References

 

EC 2.3.1
Enzymes of unknown structure